The Punta Gorda Fish Company Ice House is a historic site near North Captiva Island, Florida. It is located at the north shore entrance to Safety Harbor. On April 20, 1989, it was added to the U.S. National Register of Historic Places.

See also
Punta Gorda Ice Plant

References

External links
 Lee County listings at National Register of Historic Places
 Lee County listings at Florida's Office of Cultural and Historical Programs

National Register of Historic Places in Lee County, Florida
Ice trade